A sabhā in Ancient India was an assembly, congregation, or council.  Personified as a deity, Sabhā is a daughter of Prajapati in the Atharvaveda. The term has also given rise to modern terms of Parliament of India, such as Lok Sabha (Lower House) and Rajya Sabha (Upper House), and the Indian states' Legislative Assembly, Vidhan Sabha.

In Epic Sanskrit, the term refers also to an assembly hall or council-chamber, and to a hostel, eating-house, or gambling-house.

The Mahabharata, Book 2,  has a Sabha Parva or Sabha episode, which describes the sabha under King Yudhishthira. Monier-Williams compares the word to Old English sibb "clan" (Old High German sippa), in Modern English surviving in the term gossip (from god-sib).

A Sabha in South India, particularly in Tamil Nadu, popularly refers to a body or organization involved in the promotion of fine arts such as Carnatic music, Bharatanatyam, Drama among numerous other arts. These Sabhas are concentrated mostly in and around Mylapore in Chennai and are instrumental in ensuring that connoisseurs (known as Rasikaas) from all parts of the world are treated with variety during the Music and Dance Season of Maargazhi (December / January mostly).

Sabha in nepali meaning assembly, meeting or gathering of people. For example:
Pratinidhi Sabha = House of Representatives (lower house) of National Parliament of Nepal
Rastriya Sabha = National Assembly (upper house) of National Assembly of Nepal
Pradesh Sabha = Provincial Assemblies of Nepal
 Jansabha = Gathering of people

References

Ancient India
Hindi words and phrases